The MPATGM or Man Portable Anti-Tank Guided Missile, is an Indian third generation fire-and-forget anti-tank guided missile (ATGM) derived from India's Nag ATGM. , it is being developed by the Defence Research and Development Organisation (DRDO) in partnership with Indian defence contractor VEM Technologies Private Limited.

Design
The MPATGM is a low weight, long cylindrical missile with two groups of four radial fins, larger ones at the middle, and smaller ones at the tail. It is fitted with one high-explosive anti-tank (HEAT) shaped charge warhead. The missile has a length of about 130 cm and a diameter of about 12 cm with a collapsible tripod, and launch tube of aluminum and carbon fiber to reduce weight. It has a weight of 14.5 kg, with its command launch unit (CLU) weighing 14.25 kg which combines a laser designator with digital all-weather sight. Minimum range is 200 to 300 m; maximum range is 4 km.

The MPATGM is equipped with an advanced imaging infrared homing (IIR) sensor and integrated avionics. The missile has top attack ability. It reportedly shares many similarities with ATGMs such as America's FGM-148 Javelin and Israel's Spike.

Development
DRDO started work on a man-portable version of the Nag missile in 2015. Ministry of Defence (MoD) sanctioned the official development of MPATGM on 27 January 2015 with probable completion date around 26 July 2018 at a cost of ₹73.46 crore.  

On 20 December 2017, India cancelled a major deal for acquiring the Israeli Spike (ATGM) in favour of the DRDO MPATGM, after deciding that no technology transfer was needed to develop MPATGM. However, India reauthorized the deal in January 2018 during a visit of Israeli Prime Minister Benjamin Netanyahu to India. This deal was cancelled again in June 2019 after DRDO promised to deliver the MPATGM by 2021. However, the Indian Army bought a limited number of Spike (ATGM) to cater for their immediate needs until the MPATGM is ready for induction. MPATGM user trials were planned to be complete by 2020 but postponed due COVID-19 pandemic. On induction, MPATGM will replace second generation MILAN and 9M113 Konkurs ATGMs with the infantry, parachute, and special forces.  

Indian defense startup company Tonbo Imaging with Bharat Dynamics is developing a light weight imaging infrared seeker without cryogenic compressor for MPATGM that uses real-time computing and artificial intelligence based image processing to help the missile orient itself toward the most vulnerable part of a target tank.

Production facility
The MPATGM will be manufactured by Bharat Dynamics Limited at a facility located in Bhanoor, Telangana. This facility was inaugurated on 29 September 2018.

Testing

 Test 1 – On 15 September 2018, DRDO conducted the first trial of the MPATGM; it was successful. On 16 September 2018, this was followed by another successful trial.

 Test 2 – On 13 March 2019, DRDO successfully completed Guided Flight Trials (GFT) of MPATGM at Rajasthan desert. It proved the top attack mode, at a range of 2,500 m. On 14 March 2019, another successful test occurred.

 Test 3 – On 11 September 2019, the missile was tested again. A man portable tripod launcher was used in the test. The target of the test was a dummy tank, which was hit via top attack.
 Test 4 – After a gap of one year due to COVID-19 lockdown in India, on 21 July 2021, DRDO successfully flight tested MPATGM on a target mimicking a tank using a thermal sight to prove the minimum range using direct attack at 200–300 meters. The test was to validate missile in-flight stability and deployment of guidance mechanism within short distance. With this test, the MPATGM development project is now nearer completion. During this test, the missile used a newly developed light-weight state of the art miniaturized version of the IIR seeker.

 Test 5 – On 11 January 2022, DRDO successfully flight tested MPATGM in final deliverable configuration. The test was to prove consistent performance at minimum range. It already completed a similar successful test for maximum range. The missile used a miniaturized IIR seeker with advanced avionics for on-board control and guidance. The system is now ready to enter serial production. For this test, the Indian Army demanded that the missile be effective and accurate at 200–300 m, while DRDO was looking for a minimum distance of 400–500 m. Contemporary ATGMs such as Spike-LR have a similar effective minimum range of 200 m.

Gallery

See also 

Related development
 Nag (missile)

Missiles of comparable role and configuration
 Spike-LR
 FGM-148 Javelin
 HJ-12
 Raybolt
 ALAS (missile)
 Karaok

References

External links 

 Annual Report 2018-19 Ministry of Defence, Government of India

Anti-tank guided missiles
Guided missiles of India